Irma Cristina Miranda Valenzuela (born 1996) is a Mexican model, TV Host and beauty pageant titleholder who was crowned Mexicana Universal 2022 at the pageant on May 21, 2022. As Mexicana Universal, Miranda represented Mexico at the Miss Universe 2022 competition.

Early life and education
Miranda was born in Ciudad Obregón, Sonora. She earned her bachelor’s degree in economics and finance at Sonora Institute of Technology in Ciudad Obregón.

Pageantry

Mexicana Universal 2022
As Mexicana Universal Sonora, Miranda received the right to represent Sonora at the Mexicana Universal 2022 pageant held at the Centro de Convenciones in San Luis Potosí. In the pageant, Miranda advanced to the top sixteen and ultimately the top five.

During the question and answer round of the pageant, she was asked: "How would you apply your profession, in the conservation of the environment?" She answered:

I believe that the conservation of the environment should not be divided into professions, I, as a television host and administrator, would use that platform to be able to inspire and motivate people to create awareness, that we have to take care of the only home we have, and that is the land, let’s promote education from home, values, respect, love, solidarity and empathy, so that, together, we can combat this very strong problem that we are experiencing, together, we can create a better world.

At the end of the event, Miranda went on to win the competition and was crowned Miss Universe Mexico 2022 by outgoing titleholder Débora Hallal of Sinaloa.

Miss Universe 2022
As Mexicana Universal, Miranda represented Mexico at the Miss Universe 2022 competition in January 14, 2023, but she did not make it to the Top 16.

References

External links

1996 births
Living people
Mexican beauty pageant winners
Mexicana Universal winners
Mexican female models
Miss Universe 2022 contestants
People from Ciudad Obregón
Sonora Institute of Technology alumni
21st-century Mexican women